Claudiu Codoban (born 8 April 1988) is a Romanian professional footballer who plays as an attacking midfielder for Liga III side Lotus Băile Felix. In his career, Codoban also played for teams such as Luceafărul Oradea, Gloria Bistrița, FC Botoșani, FC Brașov, FCM Baia Mare, CA Oradea or FC U Craiova, among others.

Honours
Luceafărul Oradea
Liga III: 2010–11

References

External links
 
 

1988 births
Living people
Sportspeople from Oradea
Romanian footballers
Association football midfielders
FC Bihor Oradea players
Liga I players
ACF Gloria Bistrița players
FC Botoșani players
Liga II players
CS Luceafărul Oradea players
LPS HD Clinceni players
FC Brașov (1936) players
CS Minaur Baia Mare (football) players
Liga III players
FC U Craiova 1948 players
CA Oradea players
Romanian expatriate footballers
Expatriate footballers in Germany
Romanian expatriate sportspeople in Germany